The Gujarat University is a public state university located at Ahmedabad, Gujarat, India. The university is an affiliating university at the under-graduate level and a teaching university at the postgraduate level. It is accredited B++ by NAAC. It was established in 23rd  November 1949.

History
Many leaders like Mahatma Gandhi, Sardar Patel, Anandshankar Dhruv, Ganesh Vasudev Mavalankar and Kasturbhai Lalbhai recommended formation of the university in the 1920s, and the university was established soon after the independence of India. Gujarat University was evolved out of Ahmedabad Education Society, a major educational organisation of Gujarat then.

Gujarat University was formed under the Gujarat University Act of the Government of Gujarat in 1949 as a teaching and affiliating university. It was established under the recommendation of a committee headed by Ganesh Vasudev Mavalankar for rearrangement of university education in Bombay State. Many universities were established later which resulted in decrease in jurisdiction of Gujarat University.

It is an affiliating university at the under-graduate level and a teaching one at the post-graduate level. Close to 300,000 students study at university in the courses, faculties and affiliated institutes. The university caters for external as well as enrolled students. Affiliates include 285 colleges, 35 approved institutions and 20 recognised institutions, as of 2014. Gujarat University Ranks 1st in Gujarat and 26th in India for the Category: "Public State Universities" under the prestigious Outlook-ICare India University Ranking 2019.

Organisation of the university is based on the Gujarat University Act, 1949.

Campus

Academics

Rankings

 Gujarat University has successfully achieved First rank (5 Star) in the Gujarat State Institutional Rating Framework (GSIRF) for the academic year 2020-21. 
 Gujarat University Ranks 1st in Gujarat and 26th in India for the Category: "Public State Universities" under the prestigious Outlook-ICARE India University Rankings 2021
 The National Institutional Ranking Framework (NIRF) ranked Gujarat University 60th overall in India and 44th among universities in 2020
 The National Institutional Ranking Framework (NIRF) ranked Gujarat University 62nd overall in India and 43rd among universities in 2021.

Awards
Gujarat University has received the University Level National Service Scheme Award (2016–17) by President of India Ram Nath Kovind.

Student life
In March 2012, the university started a campus radio service named GURU on 90.8 MHz, which was first kind of it in the state of Gujarat and fifth in India.

Notable alumni and faculties

Pranav Mistry (born 1981), Indian computer scientist and inventor.
Hasmukh Adhia, IAS, Revenue Secretary of India.
Mallika Sarabhai, Kuchipudi and Bharatanatyam dancer
Sudhir Mehta, Chairman, Torrent Group
Ashis Nandy, Political psychologist and social theorist
Deepak Pandya, neuroanatomist
Pankaj Patel, CEO of Zydus Cadila
Geet Sethi, Billiard, BKS
Haren Pandya, former Home Minister of Gujarat
Gautam Adani, Chairman, Adani Group
Harin Pathak, former MP from Ahmedabad East
Praful Bhavsar, director, Space Applications Center, ISRO
B. M. Choudary, inorganic chemist, Shanti Swarup Bhatnagar laureate
Bhupendra Nath Goswami, climatologist
Rengaswamy Ramesh, geophysicist
K. R. Devmani, film director
Kanchan Pande, geologist
Himanshu Pandya, Vice Chancellor, Gujarat University
Krishnaswamy Kasturirangan, Indian Space Scientist
Aziz Mushabber Ahmadi, 26th Chief Justice of India
Amit Shah, Minister of Home Affairs (India)
Tejas Patel, cardiologist, Padma Shri
Mahipatsinh Chavda, Academic
Abhijat Joshi, Screenwriter 
Raghuveer Chaudhari, Novelist
Saumya Joshi, Poet

See also
 List of educational institutions of Gujarat

References

External links
 

 
Educational institutions established in 1949
1949 establishments in India